Klodian Duro (born 21 December 1977) is an Albanian retired professional football and current coach of Lushnja of the Kategoria e parë.

He was a versatile midfielder who usually played in an attacking role. His brother Albert Duro was also a footballer.

Duro played as an attacking midfielder for 11 different clubs in 5 countries during a career spanning 17 years, where he won 4 Albanian Superliga titles, 3 Albanian Cups, 3 Albanian Supercups and a Cypriot Cup. He made his senior international debut in 2001, and he earned 77 caps and scored 6 goals before retiring from international football in 2011.

He became the manager of Kukësi on 24 November 2015, and he won the Albanian Cup in his first season in charge.

Club career

Early career
Duro started his professional career in 1996 playing for Elbasani. He played in Albania for Elbasani, Tirana, Vllaznia Shkodër, Partizani Tirana, in Turkey with Samsunspor, Galatasaray, Malatyaspor and Çaykur Rizespor, and in German Bundesliga with Arminia Bielefeld. In the 2007–08 season, he scored 15 league goals for Tirana, making him the joint third top goalscorer.

Omonia Nicosia
On 19 May 2008, Duro completed a transfer to Cypriot outfit Omonia Nicosia, penning a two-year contract until June 2010. Then he was included in Nedim Tutić's team for the 2008–09 UEFA Cup qualifying rounds. Duro made his competitive debut in the first leg of the first qualifying round versus Milano Kumanovo as the team won 2–0. He also appeared in the returning leg as Omonia won again to qualify to the next round 4–1 on aggregate.

Duro's first score-sheet contributions came later on 28 August in the second leg of second qualifying round against AEK Athens, netting a brace at Neo GSP Stadium, including one from 25 yards to rescue his team a 2–2 draw, which was enough to pass to the next round as Omonia had won the first leg 1–0.

Duro continued to impress even further as he was on the score-sheet again on 18 September, where he netted the opener via a free kick against Premier League side Manchester City. The Citizens however, bounced back and won 2–1. Duro's side lost the second leg with the same result which sent them crashing out of the competition.

He scored his first career hat-trick on 14 December 2008, netting three times inside 10 minutes in the 4–1 home win against APOP Kinyras.

Apollon Limassol
In the summer of 2009, Duro signed a two-year contract with Apollon Limassol FC. He made an impressive start with the new team and had the hearts of many fans of Apollon for him. For Apollon it was the most important transfer during that season.

LASK
In August 2010, Duro left Cyprus after two years and joined Austrian Football Bundesliga side LASK on a one-year contract. He appears in 17 league matches and scored 2 goals.

Tirana
Duro returned to Albania in September 2011 with his former side KF Tirana for his third stint at the club. He signed a two-year contract on a free transfer with the club after agreeing terms with the club directors.

International career
Duro had 77 appearances for the Albania National Team and scored six goals. He scored the first goal with the Albania National Team against Russia on 16 October 2002 in a 1–4 loss of Albania in Russia. On 4 September 2004, European Champion Greece lost 2–1 to Albania at Tirana. Albanian midfielder Klodian Duro was quoted as saying, "Let the world know we're the best here," and after the match fans paraded around with banners that read "This is not Portugal," a reference to the Greeks' stunning win in Euro 2004. Against Bulgaria he scored the goal of a 1–1 draw in 2007. Duro scored against Malta twice in a 3–0 Albania win of a 2007 friendly match and in a 3–0 World Cup 2010 qualifications. He scored against Cyprus in a 6–1 win of Albania in August 2009. Duro also scored against the Bosnia and Herzegovina national football team in a 1–1 draw in October 2010. Duro is considered to be one of the best players in the story of Albanian football and he is also one of the players with most appearances with the Albania National Team.

Managerial career

Kukësi
On 24 November 2015, Duro was appointment the new coach of Albanian Superliga side FK Kukësi, replacing Marcello Troisi who was sacked by the club directors due to lack of results. During his presentation, Duro said that the main goal of Kukësi is to qualify in European competitions for the next season.

In his first match in charge, Kukësi fall at Zeqir Ymeri Stadium to Partizani Tirana by losing 0–1. Duro won his match as a coach four days later, however, leading Kukësi into a 1–0 away win against Flamurtari Vlorë. He won the Albanian Cup in his first season in charge, after defeating Laçi on penalties on 22 May 2016. Despite club president Safet Gjici stating that Duro was confirmed for the next season after winning the trophy, the manager left the club on 6 June and was replaced by Hasan Lika.

Kamza
On 4 September 2018, Kamza announced to have appointed Duro as the new team manager. His debut as Kamza manager came on 12 September in the 2–0 win at Besa Kavajë in Albanian Cup first round. His first league match in charge was the 2–0 home win versus newly promoted team Kastrioti Krujë.

Career statistics

Club

International

Scores and results list Albania's goal tally first, score column indicates score after each Duro goal.

Managerial

Honours

Player
Tirana
 Albanian Superliga: 1998–99, 2006–07
 Albanian Cup: 1998–99, 2005–06, 2011–12
 Albanian Supercup: 2006, 2012

Vllaznia Shkodër
 Albanian Superliga: 2000–01
 Albanian Supercup: 2001

Apollon Limassol
 Cyprus Cup: 2009–10

Manager
Kukësi
 Albanian Cup: 2015–16

References

External links

1977 births
Living people
Footballers from Elbasan
Albanian footballers
Footballers from Tirana
Albania international footballers
Albania under-21 international footballers
Association football midfielders
KF Elbasani players
KF Tirana players
KF Vllaznia Shkodër players
Samsunspor footballers
Malatyaspor footballers
FK Partizani Tirana players
Çaykur Rizespor footballers
Arminia Bielefeld players
AC Omonia players
Apollon Limassol FC players
LASK players
Bundesliga players
Süper Lig players
Austrian Football Bundesliga players
Cypriot First Division players
Albanian expatriate footballers
Expatriate footballers in Turkey
Expatriate footballers in Germany
Expatriate footballers in Cyprus
Expatriate footballers in Austria
Albanian expatriate sportspeople in Turkey
Albanian expatriate sportspeople in Germany
Albanian expatriate sportspeople in Cyprus
Albanian expatriate sportspeople in Austria
Albanian football managers
FK Kukësi managers
FC Kamza managers
Kategoria Superiore players
Kategoria Superiore managers